Hasanabad Rural District may refer to:

Hasanabad Rural District (Fars Province)
Hasanabad Rural District (Eslamabad-e Gharb County), Kermanshah province
Hasanabad Rural District (Ravansar County), Kermanshah province
Hasanabad Rural District (Ray County), Tehran province